The 67th parallel south is a circle of latitude that is 67 degrees south of the Earth's equatorial plane, about 50 km south of the Antarctic Circle. It crosses the Southern Ocean and Antarctica. Every day of the month of September (post-equinox) can view both astronomical dawn and astronomical dusk.

Around the world
Starting at the Prime Meridian and heading eastwards, the parallel 67° south passes through:

{| class="wikitable plainrowheaders"
! scope="col" width="125" | Co-ordinates
! scope="col" | Continent or ocean
! scope="col" | Notes
|-
| style="background:#b0e0e6;" | 
! scope="row" style="background:#b0e0e6;" | Southern Ocean
| style="background:#b0e0e6;" | King Haakon VII Sea, south of the Atlantic Ocean
|-
| 
! scope="row" | Antarctica
| Enderby Land, territory claimed by 
|-
| style="background:#b0e0e6;" | 
! scope="row" style="background:#b0e0e6;" | Southern Ocean
| style="background:#b0e0e6;" | Amundsen Bay, King Haakon VII Sea, south of the South Atlantic
|-
| 
! scope="row" | Antarctica
| Enderby Land, claimed by 
|-
| style="background:#b0e0e6;" | 
! scope="row" style="background:#b0e0e6;" | Southern Ocean
| style="background:#b0e0e6;" | South of the Indian Ocean
|-
| 
! scope="row" rowspan="3"| Antarctica
| Kemp Land, Mac. Robertson Land, claimed by 
|-
| 
| Adélie Land, claimed by 
|-
| 
| George V Land, claimed by 
|-
| style="background:#b0e0e6;" | 
! scope="row" style="background:#b0e0e6;" | Southern Ocean
| style="background:#b0e0e6;" | Passing just south of Buckle Island, claimed by 
|-
| 
! scope="row" | Antarctica
|-
| style="background:#b0e0e6;" | 
! scope="row" style="background:#b0e0e6;" | Southern Ocean
| style="background:#b0e0e6;" | Weddell Sea, south of the Atlantic Ocean
|}

See also
66th parallel south
68th parallel south

s67